Santa Cruz Church or Church of Santa Cruz may refer to:

 Church of Santa Cruz (Lagoa), a municipality of Lagoa, the Azores
 Church of Santa Cruz (Santa Cruz, Chile), a church in Santa Cruz, Chile
 Santa Cruz Church (Laguna) or Immaculate Conception Parish Church, a Catholic church in Santa Cruz, Laguna, Philippines
 Santa Cruz Church (Manila), a Catholic church in Santa Cruz, Manila, Philippines
 Monastery of Santa Cruz (Coimbra), a monastery church in Coimbra, Portugal
 Santa Cruz Church (Bangkok), a Catholic church in Bangkok, Thailand
 Church of Santa Cruz de Cangas de Onís, a church in northern Spain